Different Drummer is the third and final album by Isley-Jasper-Isley, released in 1987. Following its release, the Isleys would reunite with the Isley Brothers, while Jasper would go solo. "8th Wonder of the World" and "Givin' You Back the Love" entered the R&B Top 20.

Critical reception
AllMusic wrote that "the singing was perfunctory, the production and arrangements routine, and [the band] got little mileage from any of the material."

Track listing
All tracks produced, arranged and written by Isley-Jasper-Isley (track 8 written with Deborah McDuffie)

Information is based on Liner notes

Different Drummer  (5:46) Lead vocals: Ernie Isley
8th Wonder of the World (5:30) Lead vocals: Ernie IsleyCongas: Kevin Jones
Blue Rose (5:54) Lead vocals: Ernie Isley
Do It Right (4:05) Lead vocals: Chris JasperCongas: Kevin Jones
Givin' You Back the Love (5:24) Lead vocals: Chris JasperCongas: Kevin Jones
A Once in a Lifetime Lady (4:22) Lead vocals: Chris Jasper
For the Sake of Love (5:15) Lead vocals: Ernie Isley
Brother to Brother (3:49) Lead vocals: Chris Jasper
I Wanna Be Yours (4:30) Lead vocals: Chris Jasper

Personnel
Ernie Isley – lead guitar, drums, additional percussion
Chris Jasper – Grand piano, electric piano, additional synthesizers, additional percussion
Marvin Isley – Fender bass, electric bass, Roland synthesizer, additional synthesizers, additional percussion, background vocals
Carol Cafiero – assistant engineer
David Dachinger – recording engineer, audio mixing
Lance McVicar – assistant engineer
Billy Messinetti – additional music programming, Simmons SD VII
Rich Novak – assistant engineer
Tim Reppert – assistant engineer
Ed Tuton – additional music programming, DX7, Linn 9000
Tom Vercillo – assistant engineer

References

Isley-Jasper-Isley albums
1987 albums